Mahmoud M. Ayoub (June 1, 1935 – October 31, 2021) was a Lebanese Islamic scholar and professor of religious and inter-faith studies.

Early life
Mahmoud was born into a devout Muslim family on June 1, 1935 at Ain Qana (South Lebanon), a small town with an integrated religious population.  His upbringing was socially integrated with events and people from both the Islamic and Christian religious faiths. Mahmoud Ayoub attended a British Presbyterian missionary school for the blind as a child. He described his experience in that school noting that "the school authorities did not really have an educational programme for us, what they wanted to do mainly was to make us Christians and of course they did and that created a lot of tension between me and my family, particularly my father." He would later join an American Southern Baptist Church seeking a more zealous approach of reaching others with the Gospel. During his university studies, he would eventually revert to Islam.

Education
After receiving a Bachelor of Arts in philosophy from the American University of Beirut in 1964, he moved to America to complete a Master of Arts in religious thought from the University of Pennsylvania in 1966 and then a doctorate in history of religion from Harvard University in 1975. It was during his studies he resolved returning to Islam as his mother and father had wished for.

Career
Ayoub was the faculty associate of Shi’ite Islam and Christian-Muslim relations and co-director at the Duncan Black MacDonald Center for the Study of Islam and Christian-Muslim relations for Hartford Seminary at Georgetown University.

From 1988 to 2008, Mahmoud was professor and director of Islamic studies at the Department of Religion at Temple University in Philadelphia, an adjunct professor at Hartford Seminary in Connecticut, a research fellow at the Middle East Center at the University of Pennsylvania and a Tolson visiting professor at the Pacific School of Religion at Berkeley University.

In 1998, Ayoub helped develop and start a graduate Master of Arts-level program in Muslim-Christian relations and comparative religion for the Centre for Christian-Muslim Studies at the University of Balamand in Lebanon. Ayoub has also taught at San Diego State University, the University of Toronto and McGill University.

Published work
Mahmoud Ayoub is author of various books and publications, some of which are:

 Redemptive Suffering In Islam (1978) 
 The Qur'an and Its Interpreters - Volume I (1984)  
 The Qur'an and Its Interpreters - Volume II (1992) 
 Islam: Faith and History (2005) 
 A Muslim View Of Christianity: Essays On Dialogue (2007) 
 The Crisis Of Muslim History: Religion And Politics In Early Islam (2014)

Theological position
Mahmoud Ayoub promotes a moderate interpretation and understanding of Islamic theology.

A 2006 article about Muslim cab drivers and their adherence to the various religious rules and keeping the letter of the laws of Islam, when speaking to cab drivers transporting customers having alcoholic products, Ayoub is quoted saying "I know many Muslims who own gas stations [alcohol is prohibited in Islam] and sell ham sandwiches [pork is prohibited in Islam]. They justify it and I think rightly so; that they have to make a living."

In 2013 when responding to questions about ISIS/ISIL, Ayoub dismissed them as contrary to Islam, stating that extremism has always been a problem in the religion, noting that Islam is unique among faiths in that it was founded as both a religion and a state. Mahmoud clarified the ideal dynamic would be a balance between the two with the state remaining in ultimate control. He further stated that from Islam's earliest beginnings, some have challenged that balance and sought to impose brutal theocracies, citing one group early in Islamic history that acted much like ISIS, trying to found a theocracy and killing all those who resisted or disagreed with it. "My view is the action of ISIS is not unique. Extremism appears in every epoch of Islam."

At a lecture in 2013 at Oakwood University in Huntsville, Alabama, Ayoub said at the heart of the Islamic moral system is love, the basis for peace. In quoting a passage from the Hadith (collected sayings of Muhammad): "No one of you will be a true believer until he loves for his brother what he loves for himself."

In a 2014 article in The Jewish Exponent regarding religious observations, Ayoub's words are quoted “Repentance may be regarded as the cornerstone of religious life of both the individual and society.”

In the media
In 2009 Ayoub voiced his opinion regarding the idea of a U.S. Muslim college, believing Muslims are better off attending established American schools, saying U.S. Muslims badly need a seminary since there are none in the country: "I don't know that I would send my child to go to a college where they can only learn tradition. Young people have to live, I like mixing people. I don't like ghettos."

On 24 March 2015 the Peace Islands Institute brought together Mahmoud M. Ayoub and Neset Ulusal of Quinnipiac University for a discussion entitled "Muslim Voices Against Extremism".

In a 2015 article Ayoub's work was mentioned as helping develop a scholarly approach to inter-faith relations between Islam and Christianity.

In 2016 Ayoub was mentioned being the “driving force behind establishing the chair and raising money for it” regarding the first academic chair in North America dedicated to Shi’i studies at Hartford to help complementing and contrasting dialogue balancing the predominant Sunni view of Islamic thought.

Controversy
In 2008 Ayoub was instrumental in persuading the International Institute of Islamic Thought (IIIT) into donating $1.5 million for the Temple University Seminary chair office. This effort was met with warnings from David Horowitz claiming the IIIT group had funded terrorism and having terrorist ties. After the university seemed unable to publicly respond with an open acceptance or rejection of the donation, the IIIT withdrew its offer in December of that year. Although IIIT had been investigated by the Federal Bureau of Investigation and the Department of Homeland Security after the domestic terrorist attacks on 11 September 2001, no charges were brought against their organization.

Awards
In 2012, Mr. Ayoub received the Distinguished Scholar Award from the International Institute of Islamic Thought (IIIT).

Mahmoud has received a Kent Doctoral Fellowship, a Fulbright scholarship and a Canada Council Fellowship.

Death 
Mahmoud M. Ayoub died in Montreal where he lived for the past several years on 31 October 2021.

References

External links
 Georgetown University Professor's Page
 Interviews with Professor Ayoud

1935 births
2021 deaths
Lebanese Shia Muslims
Hashemite people
Harvard Divinity School alumni
American University of Beirut alumni
University of Pennsylvania alumni
Farabi International Award recipients
American blind people
Lebanese blind people
People from Nabatieh District
Fulbright alumni
Blind academics